Andreytsevo is a rural locality (a village) in Penkinskoye Rural Settlement, Kameshkovsky District, Vladimir Oblast, Russia. The population was 2 as of 2010.

Geography 
Andreytsevo is located 23 km southwest of Kameshkovo (the district's administrative centre) by road. Yuryatino is the nearest rural locality.

References 

Rural localities in Kameshkovsky District